Luka Bilobrk (born 8 December 1985) is a Bosnian professional footballer who plays as a goalkeeper for Bosnian Premier League club Radnik Bijeljina.

Club career
On 24 August 2020, Bilobrk joined Austrian club Horn.

On 1 February 2021, he returned to Bosnian Premier League club Radnik Bijeljina. Bilobrk debuted in a league game against Velež Mostar on 27 February 2021.

Honours
Travnik
First League of FBiH: 2006–07

Široki Brijeg
Bosnian Cup: 2012–13, 2016–17

References

External links
Luka Bilobrk at Sofascore
Profile - ÖFB

1985 births
Living people
People from Travnik
Association football goalkeepers
Bosnia and Herzegovina footballers
NK Travnik players
NK Čelik Zenica players
NK Široki Brijeg players
FK Radnik Bijeljina players
SV Horn players
Premier League of Bosnia and Herzegovina players
Austrian Regionalliga players
2. Liga (Austria) players
Bosnia and Herzegovina expatriate footballers
Expatriate footballers in Austria
Bosnia and Herzegovina expatriate sportspeople in Austria